Last of the Desperados is a 1955 American Western film directed by Sam Newfield and written by Orville H. Hampton. The film stars James Craig, Jim Davis, Barton MacLane, Margia Dean, Donna Martell, Myrna Dell, Bob Steele and Stanley Clements. The film was released on December 1, 1955, by Associated Film Releasing Corporation.

Plot

Cast          
James Craig as Pat Garrett
Jim Davis as John Poe
Barton MacLane as Mosby 
Margia Dean as Sarita McGuire
Donna Martell as Felice
Myrna Dell as Clara Wightman
Bob Steele as Charlie Bowdre
Stanley Clements as Bert McGuire
Dick Elliott as Walter Stone

References

External links
 

1955 films
1950s English-language films
American Western (genre) films
1955 Western (genre) films
Films directed by Sam Newfield
1950s American films
American black-and-white films